Cifuentes is a municipality located in the province of Guadalajara, Spain. According to the 2007 census (INE), the municipality has a population of 2,044 inhabitants. The historic Church of San Salvador stands in the town.

References

External links

Municipalities in the Province of Guadalajara